Guapira myrtiflora is a species of plant in the Nyctaginaceae family. It is found in Colombia, Panama, and Peru.

References

Nyctaginaceae
Least concern plants
Taxonomy articles created by Polbot